The 2022–23 Washington Wizards season is the 62nd season of the franchise in the National Basketball Association (NBA) and 49th in the Washington, D.C. area.

Draft picks

The Wizards entered the 2022 NBA Draft holding one first round pick and one second round pick.

Roster

Standings

Division

Conference

Game log

Preseason

|-style="background:#fcc;"
| 1
| September 30
| Golden State
| 
| Rui Hachimura (13)
| Rui Hachimura (9)
| Monté Morris (5)
| Saitama Super Arena20,497
| 0–1
|-style="background:#fcc;"
| 2
| October 1
| @ Golden State
| 
| Kristaps Porziņģis (18)
| Rui Hachimura (10)
| Delon Wright (6)
| Saitama Super Arena20,647
| 0–2
|-style="background:#cfc;"
| 3
| October 10
| @ Charlotte
| 
| Kristaps Porziņģis (20)
| Daniel Gafford (7)
| Monté Morris (7)
| Spectrum Center9,478
| 1–2
|- style="background:#fcc;"
| 4
| October 14
| @ New York
| 
| Rui Hachimura (20)
| Rui Hachimura (8)
| Bradley Beal (5)
| Madison Square Garden19,812
| 1–3

Regular season

|- style="background:#cfc;"
| 1
| October 19
| @ Indiana
| 
| Bradley Beal (23)
| Kyle Kuzma (13)
| Beal, Morris (6)
| Gainbridge Fieldhouse15,027
| 1–0
|- style="background:#cfc;"
| 2
| October 21
| Chicago
| 
| Kyle Kuzma (26)
| Deni Avdija (10)
| Bradley Beal (8)
| Capital One Arena20,476
| 2–0
|- style="background:#fcc;"
| 3
| October 23
| @ Cleveland
| 
| Bradley Beal (27)
| Kristaps Porziņģis (11)
| Monté Morris (6)
| Rocket Mortgage FieldHouse19,432
| 2–1
|-style="background:#cfc;"
| 4
| October 25
| Detroit
| 
| Kyle Kuzma (25)
| Avdija, Porziņģis (7)
| Beal, Morris (6)
| Capital One Arena13,196
| 3–1
|- style="background:#fcc;"
| 5
| October 28
| Indiana
| 
| Bradley Beal (31)
| Kyle Kuzma (9)
| Monté Morris (12)
| Capital One Arena13,463
| 3–2
|-style="background:#fcc;"
| 6
| October 30
| @ Boston
| 
| Kristaps Porziņģis (17)
| Kristaps Porziņģis (13)
| Bradley Beal (8)
| TD Garden19,156
| 3–3
|-style="background:#fcc;"
| 7
| October 31
| Philadelphia
| 
| Kristaps Porziņģis (32)
| Kristaps Porziņģis (9)
| Bradley Beal (6)
| Capital One Arena13,746
| 3–4

|-style="background:#cfc;"
| 8
| November 2
| @ Philadelphia
| 
| Kristaps Porziņģis (30)
| Rui Hachimura (10)
| Monté Morris (6)
| Wells Fargo Center19,855
| 4–4
|-style="background:#fcc;"
| 9
| November 4
| Brooklyn
| 
| Bradley Beal (20)
| Kristaps Porziņģis (10)
| Monté Morris (5)
| Capital One Arena17,258
| 4–5
|-style="background:#fcc;"
| 10
| November 6
| @ Memphis
| 
| Monté Morris (18)
| Kyle Kuzma (11)
| Barton, Goodwin (5)
| FedExForum16,877
| 4–6
|- style="background:#cfc;"
| 11
| November 7
| @ Charlotte
| 
| Kyle Kuzma (20)
| Kristaps Porziņģis (8)
| Goodwin, Porziņģis (5)
| Spectrum Center13,712
| 5–6
|- style="background:#cfc;"
| 12
| October 25
| Dallas
| 
| Kyle Kuzma (26)
| Kyle Kuzma (11)
| Goodwin, Kuzma (6)
| Capital One Arena18,320
| 6–6
|-style="background:#cfc;
| 13
| November 12
| Utah
| 
| Kristaps Porziņģis (31)
| Kristaps Porziņģis (10)
| Monté Morris (9)
| Capital One Arena13,673
| 7–6
|-style="background:#cfc;"
| 14
| November 13
| Memphis
| 
| Kristaps Porziņģis (25)
| Kyle Kuzma (11)
| Monté Morris (6)
| Capital One Arena17,667
| 8–6
|-  style="background:#fcc;"
| 15
| November 16
| Oklahoma City
| 
| Kristaps Porziņģis (27)
| Kyle Kuzma (10)
| Kyle Kuzma (9)
| Capital One Arena12,630
| 8–7
|-  style="background:#cfc;"
| 16
| November 18
| Miami
| 
| Bradley Beal (27)
| Kristaps Porziņģis (17)
| Bradley Beal (8)
| Capital One Arena18,772
| 9–7
|-style="background:#cfc;"
| 17
| November 20
| Charlotte
| 
| Kyle Kuzma (28)
| Deni Avdija (13)
| Beal, Kuzma (5)
| Capital One Arena14,289
| 10–7
|-style="background:#fcc;"
| 18
| November 23
| @ Miami
| 
| Kyle Kuzma (33)
| Avdija, Porziņģis (9)
| Deni Avdija (10)
| FTX Arena19,600
| 10–8
|-style="background:#fcc;"
| 19
| November 25
| @ Miami
| 
| Beal, Kuzma (28)
| Deni Avdija (9)
| Avdija, Beal, Kuzma (5)
| FTX Arena19,600
| 10–9
|-style="background:#fcc;"
| 20
| November 27
| @ Boston
| 
| Bradley Beal (30)
| Bradley Beal (5)
| Monté Morris (8)
| TD Garden19,156
| 10–10
|-style="background:#cfc;"
| 21
| November 28
| Minnesota
| 
| Kristaps Porziņģis (41)
| Kyle Kuzma (8)
| Kyle Kuzma (9)
| Capital One Arena13,515
| 11–10
|- style="background:#fcc;"
| 22
| November 30
| @ Brooklyn
| 
| Kristaps Porziņģis (27)
| Kristaps Porziņģis (19)
| Bradley Beal (6)
| Barclays Center15,963
| 11–11

|-style="background:#fcc;"
| 23
| December 2
| @ Charlotte
| 
| Bradley Beal (33)
| Daniel Gafford (12)
| Bradley Beal (7)
| Spectrum Center15,231
| 11–12
|-style="background:#fcc;"
| 24
| December 4
| L.A. Lakers
| 
| Kristaps Porziņģis (27)
| Kristaps Porziņģis (9)
| Will Barton (5)
| Capital One Arena19,647
| 11–13
|-style="background:#fcc;"
| 25
| December 7
| @ Chicago
| 
| Kristaps Porziņģis (28)
| Kristaps Porziņģis (9)
| Monté Morris (8)
| United Center19,265
| 11–14
|-style="background:#fcc;"
| 26
| December 9
| @ Indiana
| 
| Kristaps Porziņģis (29)
| Avdija, Porziņģis (9)
| Kyle Kuzma (7)
| Gainbridge Fieldhouse15,039
| 11–15
|-style=background:#fcc;"
| 27
| December 10
| L.A. Clippers
| 
| Kyle Kuzma (35)
| Kristaps Porziņģis (15)
| Goodwin, Porziņģis (6)
| Capital One Arena18,404
| 11–16
|-style="background:#fcc;"
| 28
| December 12
| Brooklyn
| 
| Will Barton (22)
| Daniel Gafford (10)
| Barton, Goodwin (7)
| Capital One Arena16,090
| 11–17
|-style="background:#fcc;"
| 29
| December 14
| @ Denver
| 
| Kyle Kuzma (24)
| Daniel Gafford (8)
| Will Barton (9)
| Ball Arena19,550
| 11–18
|-style="background:#fcc;"
| 30
| December 17
| @ L.A. Clippers
| 
| Kristaps Porziņģis (19)
| Deni Avdija (10)
| Avdija, Morris (5)
| Crypto.com Arena15,018
| 11–19
|-style="background:#fcc;"
| 31
| December 18
| @ L.A. Lakers
| 
| Bradley Beal (29)
| Kyle Kuzma (16)
| Goodwin, Porziņģis (5)
| Crypto.com Arena18,153
| 11–20
|-style="background:#cfc;"
| 32
| December 20
| @ Phoenix
| 
| Kyle Kuzma (29)
| Deni Avdija (10)
| Beal, Kuzma (6)
| Footprint Center17,071
| 12–20
|-style="background:#fcc;"
| 33
| December 22
| @ Utah
| 
| Bradley Beal (30)
| Rui Hachimura (7)
| Bradley Beal (5)
| Vivint Arena18,206
| 12–21
|-style="background:#cfc;"
| 34
| December 23
| @ Sacramento
| 
| Kyle Kuzma (32)
| Kristaps Porziņģis (13)
| Delon Wright (8)
| Golden 1 Center17,894
| 13–21
|-style="background:#cfc;"
| 35
| December 27
| Philadelphia
| 
| Kristaps Porziņģis (24)
| Kristaps Porziņģis (10)
| Monté Morris (7)
| Capital One Arena20,476
| 14–21
|-style="background:#cfc;"
| 36
| December 28
| Phoenix
| 
| Rui Hachimura (30)
| Daniel Gafford (8)
| Monté Morris (8)
| Capital One Arena20,476
| 15–21
|-style="background:#cfc;"
| 37
| December 30
| @ Orlando
| 
| Kristaps Porziņģis (30)
| Kristaps Porziņģis (13)
| Monté Morris (10)
| Amway Center19,040
| 16–21

|-style="background:#cfc;"
| 38
| January 1
| @ Milwaukee
| 
| Rui Hachimura (26)
| Kyle Kuzma (13)
| Kyle Kuzma (11)
| Fiserv Forum17,341
| 17–21
|-style="background:#fcc;"
| 39
| January 3
| @ Milwaukee
| 
| Kristaps Porziņģis (22)
| Daniel Gafford (12)
| Monté Morris (6)
| Fiserv Forum17,341
| 17–22
|-style="background:#fcc;"
| 40
| January 6
| @ Oklahoma City 
|  
| Kyle Kuzma (23)
| Kristaps Porziņģis (10)
| Kyle Kuzma (7)
| Paycom Center14,790
| 17–23
|-style="background:#fcc;"
| 41
| January 9
| New Orleans 
|  
| Kristaps Porziņģis (23)
| Kristaps Porziņģis (10)
| Monté Morris (9)
| Capital One Arena16,223
| 17–24
|-style="background:#cfc;"
| 42
| January 11
| @ Chicago
| 
| Kyle Kuzma (21)
| Deni Avdija (20)
| Avdija, Gibson, Kuzma, Morris, Wright (3)
| Capital One Arena17,032
| 18–24
|-style="background:#fcc;"
| 43
| January 13
| New York
| 
| Kyle Kuzma (40)
| Deni Avdija (9)
| Kyle Kuzma (7)
| Capital One Arena20,476
| 18–25
|-style="background:#fcc;"
| 44
| January 15
| Golden State
| 
| Kristaps Porziņģis (32)
| Kyle Kuzma (11)
| Monté Morris (10)
| Capital One Arena20,476
| 18–26
|-style="background:#cfc;"
| 45
| January 18
| @ New York
| 
| Kyle Kuzma (27)
| Kyle Kuzma (13)
| Kyle Kuzma (7)
| Madison Square Garden19,164
| 19–26
|-style="background:#cfc;"
| 46
| January 21
| Orlando
| 
| Rui Hachimura (30)
| Kyle Kuzma (10)
| Beal, Wright (8)
| Capital One Arena18,171
| 20–26
|-style="background:#cfc;"
| 47
| January 24
| @ Dallas
| 
| Kyle Kuzma (30)
| Deni Avdija (10)
| Delon Wright (6)
| American Airlines Center20,077
| 21–26
|-style="background:#cfc;"
| 48
| January 25
| @ Houston
| 
| Kyle Kuzma (33)
| Deni Avdija (10)
| Beal, Nunn, Wright (4)
| Toyota Center15,302
| 22–26
|-style="background:#cfc;"
| 49
| January 28
| @ New Orleans
| 
| Daniel Gafford (21)
| Daniel Gafford (12)
| Beal, Kuzma (5)
| Smoothie King Center17,692
| 23–26
|-style="background:#cfc;"
| 50
| January 30
| @ San Antonio
| 
| Deni Avdija (25)
| Avdija, Porziņģis (9)
| Beal, Porziņģis (7)
| AT&T Center11,970
| 24–26

|-style="background:#ccc;"
| —
| February 1
| @  Detroit
| colspan="6" | Postponed due to ice storm (Rescheduled: March 7)
|-style="background:#fcc;"
| 51
| February 3
| Portland
| 
| Bradley Beal (34)
| Kyle Kuzma (11)
| Kuzma, Morris (6)
| Capital One Arena20,476
| 24–27
|-style="background:#fcc;"
| 52
| February 4
| @ Brooklyn
| 
| Kristaps Porziņģis (38)
| Daniel Gafford (10)
| Monté Morris (8)
| Barclays Center17,732
| 24–28
|-style="background:#fcc;"
| 53
| February 6
| Cleveland
| 
| Kristaps Porziņģis (18)
| Daniel Gafford (8)
| Monté Morris (7)
| Capital One Arena16,744
| 24–29
|-style="background:#cfc;"
| 54
| February 8
| Charlotte
| 
| Kristaps Porziņģis (36)
| Deni Avdija (13)
| Beal, Wright (10)
| Capital One Arena16,097
| 25–29
|-style="background:#cfc;"
| 55
| February 11
| Indiana
| 
| Bradley Beal (32)
| Kristaps Porziņģis (10)
| Beal, Nunn (6)
| Capital One Arena18,387
| 26–29
|-style="background:#fcc;"
| 56
| February 13
| @ Golden State
| 
| Kristaps Porziņģis (34)
| Daniel Gafford (8)
| Kendrick Nunn (6)
| Chase Center18,064
| 26–30
|-style="background:#cfc;"
| 57
| February 14
| @ Portland
| 
| Kyle Kuzma (33)
| Kristaps Porziņģis (12)
| Delon Wright (6)
| Moda Center18,004
| 27–30
|-style="background:#cfc;"
| 58
| February 16
| @ Minnesota
| 
| Bradley Beal (35)
| Deni Avdija (9)
| Monté Morris (6)
| Target Center17,136
| 28–30
|-style="background:#fcc;"
| 59
| February 24
| New York
| 
| Kuzma, Porziņģis (23)
| Deni Avdija (7)
| Bradley Beal (8)
| Capital One Arena20,476
| 28–31
|-style="background:#fcc;"
| 60
| February 26
| @ Chicago
| 
| Bradley Beal (18)
| Daniel Gafford (11)
| Bradley Beal (8)
| United Center21,106
| 28–32
|-style="background:#cfc;"
| 61
| February 28
| @ Atlanta
| 
| Bradley Beal (37)
| Daniel Gafford (12)
| Bradley Beal (7)
| State Farm Arena17,395
| 29–32

|-style="background:#cfc;"
| 62
| March 2
| Toronto
| 
| Kyle Kuzma (30)
| Deni Avdija (9)
| Delon Wright (11)
| Capital One Arena14,643
| 30–32
|-style="background:#fcc;"
| 63
| March 4
| Toronto
| 
| Kristaps Porziņģis (22)
| Kristaps Porziņģis (11)
| Bradley Beal (10)
| Capital One Arena18,174
| 30–33
|-style="background:#fcc;"
| 64
| March 5
| Milwaukee
| 
| Bradley Beal (33)
| Kristaps Porziņģis (13)
| Porziņģis, Wright (5)
| Capital One Arena18,746
| 30–34
|-style="background:#cfc;"
| 65
| March 7
| @ Detroit
| 
| Bradley Beal (32)
| Beal, Gafford, Porziņģis (7)
| Bradley Beal (7)
| Little Caesars Arena17,855
| 31–34
|-style="background:#fcc;"
| 66
| March 7
| Atlanta
| 
| Kristaps Porziņģis (43)
| Kyle Kuzma (10)
| Bradley Beal (8)
| Capital One Arena15,087
| 31–35
|-style="background:#fcc;"
| 67
| March 10
| Atlanta
| 
| Bradley Beal (27)
| Kristaps Porziņģis (9)
| Monté Morris (8)
| Capital One Arena18,161
| 31–36
|-style="background:#fcc;"
| 68
| March 12
| Philadelphia
| 
| Corey Kispert (25)
| Kyle Kuzma (11)
| Beal, Kuzma (4)
| Wells Fargo Center21,220
| 31–37
|-style="background:#cfc;"
| 69
| March 14
| Detroit
| 
| Bradley Beal (36)
| Monté Morris (8)
| Bradley Beal (7)
| Capital One Arena15,279
| 32–37
|-style="background:#fcc;"
| 70
| March 17
| @ Cleveland
| 
| Bradley Beal (22)
| Kristaps Porziņģis (9)
| Beal, Morris (5)
| Rocket Mortgage FieldHouse19,432
| 32–38
|-style="background:#fcc;"
| 71
| March 18
| Sacramento
| 
| Kyle Kuzma (33)
| Deni Avdija (11)
| Deni Avdija (6)
| Capital One Arena18,529
| 32–39

Transactions

Trades

Free Agents

Re-signed

Additions

Subtractions

References

Washington Wizards seasons
Washington Wizards
Washington Wizards
Washington Wizards